Lajos Bonyhai (29 June 1913 – 16 March 1976) was a Hungarian footballer. He competed in the men's tournament at the 1936 Summer Olympics.

References

External links

1913 births
1976 deaths
Hungarian footballers
Olympic footballers of Hungary
Footballers at the 1936 Summer Olympics
Sportspeople from Miskolc
Association football midfielders
Diósgyőri VTK players